Thomas Neir is currently CEO of TorrX, Inc. and a partner in Cow Hollow Associates, LLC He also founded and was the chief executive officer of the Pacific Coffee Company from the time of the company's founding until May 2005. Neir had also been a hi-tech company executive and senior financial analyst.

Personal
Neir is married with two sons.

In 2012 Thomas Neir was on the board of Seattle Tilth from 2012 to 2017, and was appointed to Kirkland, Washington's Transportation Commission in 2009, termed out after role as chairman.

Educational background
In 1979, he graduated with a Bachelor of Arts in Economics from the University of Washington. In 1988, he received an MBA from the Darden Graduate School of Business Administration, University of Virginia.

Working experience
Since 1988, Neir had worked for a California-based hi-tech company, Tandem Computers, as senior financial analyst and marketing analyst. In late 1990, Neir was transferred to Hong Kong as area finance manager.

Foundation of the Pacific Coffee Company
In Hong Kong,  Neir discovered that there was a lack of European-style coffee houses. He set up the Pacific Coffee Company, targeted at top business persons and senior executive-level customers in Hong Kong. The first retail outlet was located in the Bank of America Tower, Central, Hong Kong.

The number of Pacific Coffee Company stores and outlets is over 135 in Hong Kong and over 400 locations in Asia, primarily China.

External links

American businesspeople
Living people
Year of birth missing (living people)
Hong Kong businesspeople
People from Kirkland, Washington
University of Washington College of Arts and Sciences alumni
University of Virginia Darden School of Business alumni